Maple Lake is a lake in Douglas County, in the U.S. state of Minnesota.

Maple Lake was named for the groves of maple near the lake.

References

Lakes of Minnesota
Lakes of Douglas County, Minnesota